C. P. Wang (Wang Chung-ping) (born 1947 in Beijing, China) is a Taiwanese architect. He received his bachelor's degree from Tunghai University in 1971 and his Master of Architecture from the School of Architecture at Washington University in St. Louis in 1973. He is co-principal of the architectural firm C.Y. Lee & Partners, located in Taipei, Taiwan. C.P. Wang was one of the prominent designers of Taipei 101, which was the world's tallest skyscraper from 2004 to 2010.

List of major designs

Taiwan
Hung Kuo Building, Taipei, 1989.
Grand 50 Tower, Kaohsiung, Taiwan's tallest building from 1992 to 1993.
Far Eastern Plaza I & II, Taipei, 1994.
Tuntex Sky Tower, Kaohsiung, Taiwan's tallest building from 1997 to 2004.
Splendor Hotel, Taichung, 1997.
Taiwan Taoyuan International Airport-Terminal 2, Taoyuan, 2000.
Chung Tai Chan Monastery, Nantou, the tallest Buddhist temple in the world since 2001, and the tallest Buddhist Building in the world from 2001 to 2006.
New Chien-Cheng Circle, Taipei, 2003.
Taipei 101, Taipei, Taiwan's tallest building since 2004, and the tallest skyscraper in the world from 2004 to 2009.
China
Post & Telecommunications Center, Tianjin, 1998.
Yuda International Trade Center, Zhengzhou, 1999.
Fangyuan Mansion, Shenyang, 2001.
Jinsha Plaza, Shenyang, 2001.
Pangu 7 Star Hotel, Beijing, 2008

Quotes

See also
Taipei 101
C.Y. Lee, C.P. Wang's architect partner

References

External links
C. Y. Lee & Partners Official Website

1947 births
Living people
Washington University in St. Louis alumni
Sam Fox School of Design & Visual Arts alumni
Taiwanese architects
Taiwanese people from Beijing
Tunghai University alumni